Oleksiy Oleksiyovych Dytyatyev (born 7 November 1988) is a Ukrainian professional footballer who plays as a centre-back for Lviv.

Career

Dytyatyev is a product of the FC Enerhiya Nova Kakhovka youth sportive school and spent time playing for different Ukrainian First League teams. In 2013, he signed a contract with FC Olimpik Donetsk.

He is married with one daughter Anna, born in 2013.

On 14 July 2017 he signed a contract with Polish side Cracovia.

Honours
Cracovia
Polish Cup: 2019-20

References

External links
 
 
 

Ukrainian footballers
Association football defenders
1988 births
Living people
People from Nova Kakhovka
FC Enerhiya Nova Kakhovka players
FC Krymteplytsia Molodizhne players
FC Bukovyna Chernivtsi players
FC Olimpik Donetsk players
FC Vorskla Poltava players
FC Karpaty Lviv players
MKS Cracovia (football) players
Puszcza Niepołomice players
FC Aksu players
FC Lviv players
Ukrainian Premier League players
Ukrainian First League players
Ukrainian Second League players
Ukrainian Amateur Football Championship players
Ekstraklasa players
I liga players
III liga players
Kazakhstan Premier League players
Ukrainian expatriate footballers
Expatriate footballers in Poland
Ukrainian expatriate sportspeople in Poland
Expatriate footballers in Kazakhstan
Ukrainian expatriate sportspeople in Kazakhstan
Sportspeople from Kherson Oblast